The Minister of Tourism is a Minister in the Cabinet of South Africa.

Minister of Tourism, 1992–present

External links
Department of Tourism

Lists of political office-holders in South Africa